Caldron Peak is a  mountain peak of the Waputik Range, located in Alberta, Canada. It is prominently visible from the Peyto Lake Overlook in Banff National Park.


Geology

Like other mountains in Banff Park, Caldron Peak is composed of sedimentary rock laid down during the Precambrian to Jurassic periods. Formed in shallow seas, this sedimentary rock was pushed east and over the top of younger rock during the Laramide orogeny.

Climate

Based on the Köppen climate classification, Caldron Peak is located in a subarctic climate with cold, snowy winters, and mild summers.

References

Footnotes

Two-thousanders of Alberta
Mountains of Banff National Park
Alberta's Rockies